The Cape York rock-wallaby (Petrogale coenensis) is a species of rock-wallaby restricted to Cape York Peninsula in northeastern Queensland, Australia. It is a member of a group of seven very closely related rock-wallabies, all found in northeastern Queensland, also including the Mount Claro rock-wallaby (P. sharmani), the Mareeba rock-wallaby (P. mareeba) and Godman's rock-wallaby (P. godmani).

The Cape York rock-wallaby is found only in central Cape York, from the Musgrave to the Pascoe River. It is also the only member of the group of seven species to be completely separated geographically from its relatives; it is separated from Godman's rock-wallaby by the Hann River Catchment (around 70 km).

References

Macropods
Mammals of Queensland
Marsupials of Australia
Mammals described in 1992